Amina Nadjet Berrichi (born 16 May 1995) is an Algerian sailor. She is also known as Nadjet Amina Berrichi, Amina Berrichi, or Nadjet Berrichi. She placed 27th in the Women's RS:X event at the 2020 Summer Olympics and 13th in the IQFoil event competing for Algeria at the 2022 Mediterranean Games.

References

External links
 
 
 

1995 births
Living people
Algerian female sailors (sport)
Olympic sailors of Algeria
Sailors at the 2020 Summer Olympics – RS:X
Mediterranean Games competitors for Algeria
Competitors at the 2022 Mediterranean Games
21st-century Algerian women
20th-century Algerian women
Algerian windsurfers
Female windsurfers